Gulshan Club is a social club for residents of Gulshan located in the Capital Dhaka. Rafiqul Alam Helal has been the President of the club for the year 2021- 2023  The club has been described as "exclusive".

History
Gulshan Club was founded in December 1978. it was registered under the Joint Stock Companies Act of 1913. It is officially called Gulshan Club Limited. Membership to the club is restricted to the permanent residents of Baridhara, Banani, and Gulshan. A 12-member Executive Committee which is headed by the president of the club. The members of the executive are elected annually. The club has a gym and swimming pool. The Clubs holds New Year eve's celebration.

On 29 December 2007 Engineer M Faizul Islam was elected President of Gulshan Club.

References

Clubs and societies in Bangladesh
Culture in Dhaka
Organisations based in Dhaka
1978 establishments in Bangladesh